A Dog of Flanders is an 1872 novel by English author Marie Louise de la Ramée published with her pseudonym "Ouida". It is about a Flemish boy named Nello and his dog, Patrasche, and is set in Antwerp.

In Japan, Korea, Russia, Ukraine and the Philippines, the novel has been an extremely popular children's classic for decades and has been adapted into several Japanese films and anime. Since the 1980s, the Belgian board of tourism caught on to the phenomenon and built two monuments honoring the story to please East-Asian tourists. There is a small statue of Nello and Patrasche at the Kapelstraat in the Antwerp suburb of Hoboken, and a commemorative plaque in front of the Antwerp Cathedral donated by Toyota, that was later replaced by a marble statue of the two characters covered by a cobblestone blanket, created by the artist Batist Vermeulen.

Summary 

In 19th century Belgium, a boy named Nello becomes an orphan at the age of two when his mother dies in the Ardennes. His impoverished grandfather, Jehan Daas, who lives in a small village near the city of Antwerp, takes him in.

One day, Nello and Jehan find a dog that was almost beaten to death, and name him "Patrasche". Due to the good care and kindness shown to him by Jehan, the dog recovers its health, and from then on, Nello and Patrasche are inseparable. Nello is forced to work as a milk seller, because Jehan's unnamed, crooked landlord demands that he pay more rent money or face eviction. Patrasche helps Nello pull his small milk cart into town each morning.

Nello falls in love with Aloise, the daughter of Baas Cogez, a well-off man in the village, but Baas objects, as he doesn't want his daughter to have a poor sweetheart. Although Nello is illiterate, he is very talented in drawing. He enters a junior drawing contest in Antwerp, hoping to win the first prize of 200 francs per year; however, the jury selects a different winner.

Sometime later, a fire breaks out on Baas’s property. The landlord lies and says Nello was responsible for the fire to escape responsibly for neglecting the property; Baas then tells Nello that he is never to see Aloise again. Later, Jehan dies, and the landlord promptly evicts Nello and Patrasche. With no home, they are forced to wander the streets.

Distraught and miserable, Nello decides that he wants to go to the cathedral of Antwerp, to see Rubens' The Elevation of the Cross and The Descent from the Cross — but the exhibition in the cathedral is only for paying customers, and he has no money left. On the night of Christmas Eve, Nello and Patrasche find that the door to the church has been left unlocked. They go inside, and the next morning are found dead of hypothermia in front of the triptych.

Popularity
The novel shares a reasonable notability in both the United Kingdom and the United States and is extremely popular in Ukraine, Russia, Japan, Korea and the Philippines to the point where it is seen as a children's classic. It inspired film and anime adaptations, including the 1975 animated TV series Dog of Flanders which reached an audience of 30 million viewers on its first broadcast.

In Belgium, the story is more obscure. Only in 1987 did it receive a Dutch translation; this happened after the tale was adapted into a story of the popular comic book series Suske en Wiske. Since then, monuments were raised to commemorate Nello and Patrasche to please tourists. In 2007, Didier Volckaert and An van Dienderen directed a documentary about the international popularity of the story: "Patrasche, A Dog of Flanders - Made in Japan". It researches all available film adaptations of the story and interviews several British, American and Japanese people about what attracts them to this novel.

Film, TV and theatrical adaptations

The novel has been adapted for cinema and television in live-action and animation. Many of the film versions, excluding the 1997 Japanese movie and Snow Prince (2009), replace the original ending with a more optimistic one.

 A Dog of Flanders (1914), a short film directed by Howell Hansel
 A Boy of Flanders (1924), directed by Victor Schertzinger and starring Jackie Coogan as Nello
 A Dog of Flanders (1935), directed by Edward Sloman
 A Dog of Flanders (1960), directed by James B. Clark and starring David Ladd as Nello.
 Dog of Flanders (1975), a Japanese animation TV series produced by Nippon Animation
 My Patrasche (1992), a Japanese animation TV series produced by Tokyo Movie Shinsha
 The Dog of Flanders (Japan, 1997), a remake of the 1975 TV series directed by Yoshio Kuroda. In this version, Aloise reflects on the life of Nello while working as a nun and the landlord is named Hans.
 A Dog of Flanders (1999), directed by Kevin Brodie. In this version, the landlord is named Stevens and the ending reveals that the character Michel La Grande is Nello's long-lost father.
 Barking Dogs Never Bite (2000), a South Korean satirical version directed by Bong Joon-ho
 Snow Prince (Japan, 2009), directed by Joji Matsuoka.  At the end of this film, the boy and the dog are found frozen to death under a tree. 
 A Dog of Flanders, 2011, Minoto Studios

For its authentic 19th century buildings, the Open Air Museum of Bokrijk, Flanders was used as scenery for the 1975 and 1992 anime and the 1999 film.

In one of the film versions (1959), Nello and his dog go to the village church, where the pastor covers them with a woolen blanket, thus saving their lives. Two days later, one of the judges comes. Because he thought Nello was the true winner, he asks him to stay with him. As years pass, Patrasche dies and Nello becomes a famous artist.

Documentary film
 Patrasche, a Dog of Flanders – Made in Japan (2007), a documentary film directed by Didier Volckaert and An van Dienderen.

Comic book version
The story was used as a plot device in the Suske en Wiske comic book series, namely the album Het Dreigende Dinges (The Threatening Thing) (1985). The album was translated into Japanese.

Monument
There are three monuments built to commemorate the story. The first one was built in 1985 and can be seen in the Kapelstraat in Hoboken, Antwerp. Up until the end of 2016 a fictional grave stone stood near the Antwerp Cathedral. It had text in English and Japanese that read: "Nello, and his dog Patrasche, main characters from the story "A Dog of Flanders", symbols of true and sternful friendship, loyalty and devotion."

On 10 December 2016, a new monument was revealed on the Handschoenmarkt square in front of the Antwerp Cathedral. A sculpture in white marble represents Nello and Patrasche sleeping, covered by a blanket of cobble stones. The sculpture is made by Belgian artist Batist Vermeulen (Tist).

Location
In 1985 an employee of Antwerp tourism, Jan Corteel, wanted to promote "A Dog of Flanders". He presumed the village of the story to be Hoboken, even though this is never mentioned in the story itself. Ouida is believed to have visited Antwerp for four hours, and spoke of having seen a village near a canal, not far from a windmill. This vague explanation was used to claim the story took place in Hoboken, but other people contest this.

Additional information
Similar stories:
 The Little Match Girl (1845)
 Black Beauty (1877)
 Hachi: A Dog's Tale (2009)
 Ciccio, from Italy

References

Further reading

External links

 Project Gutenberg eBook

1872 British novels
Novels by Ouida
Works published under a pseudonym
English adventure novels
Novels about orphans
Children's novels about animals
Novels about dogs
Novels set in Belgium
Antwerp in fiction
British children's books
Chapman & Hall books
British novels adapted into films
British novels adapted into television shows
Novels adapted into comics
Japanese culture
British children's novels
British adventure novels
Fictional dogs
Fictional Belgian people
Fictional child deaths